Marvin and Tamara were an English pop music duo from the United Kingdom. Their first single, "Groove Machine", peaked at No. 11 in the UK Singles Chart in August 1999. After their follow-up single, "North, South, East, West", only reached No. 38, they were subsequently dropped by their record label, Epic.

Marvin and Tamara were known for supporting Steps on their 'The Next Step Live' tour.

Single discography

References

English pop music duos
Musical groups from London
Musical groups established in 1999
Musical groups disestablished in 2000
1999 establishments in the United Kingdom